Chaudhary Sukhram Singh Yadav is an Indian politician. He was the Chairman of the Uttar Pradesh Legislative Council from 2004 to 2010.

References

Living people
Members of the Uttar Pradesh Legislative Council
Rajya Sabha members from Uttar Pradesh
1952 births